Samuel Barber's Symphony in One Movement (Op. 9), was completed 24 February 1936. It was premiered by  Rome's Philharmonic Augusteo Orchestra under the baton of Bernardino Molinari on 13 December 1936. It lasts around 21 minutes. The title given in the printed score of the work is First Symphony (in One Movement), and the uniform title is Symphonies, no. 1, op. 9.

History
Barber commenced his work on the symphony in August 1935 and completed the work at the Anabel Taylor Foundation in Roquebrune in the French Alps. It was dedicated to his long-time companion Gian Carlo Menotti. It received its American premiere by the Cleveland Orchestra, conducted by Rudolf Ringwall, on January 21 and 23, 1937, and it was performed three times on March 24 of the same year at Carnegie Hall, played by the New York Philharmonic–Symphony Orchestra under the direction of Artur Rodziński. Rodziński was a strong promoter of Barber's work, and he also conducted the Vienna Philharmonic's performance of the symphony at the opening concert of the 1937 Salzburg Festival. It was the first performance of a symphonic work by an American composer at the festival.

Analysis
The symphony is a condensed one-movement version of a classical four-movement symphony and is modeled after Sibelius' Symphony No. 7. The work is divided into four sections:

Allegro ma non troppo
Allegro molto
Andante tranquillo
Con moto

In the program notes for the New York premiere Barber explained:

Barber made some revisions to the work in 1942–43. The revised version was first performed 18 February 1944 by the Philadelphia Orchestra conducted by Bruno Walter.

Allegro non troppo
Main theme (mm. 2–4)

Lyrical second theme (mm. 29–31)

Closing theme (mm. 61–64)

Scherzo
First theme in diminution (mm. 138–42)

Andante tranquillo
Second theme (mm. 437–445)

Passacaglia
First theme (mm. 522–27)

References

Sources

Further reading
 Friedewald, Russell Edward. 1957. "A Formal and Stylistic Analysis of the Published Music of Samuel Barber". PhD diss. Ames: Iowa State University.
 Tawa, Nicholas E. 2009. The Great American Symphony: Music, the Depression, and War. Bloomington, Indiana: Indiana University Press. .

External links
 National Symphony Orchestra program notes

Compositions by Samuel Barber
Barber 01
1936 compositions